The Type 63A (also known as the ZTS63A) is an amphibious light tank upgraded from the Type 63, designed for river-crossing operations at inland rivers and lakes. Its industrial designation is WZ213.

The Type 63A is being replaced by the ZTD-05 Amphibious Assault Tank.

Development
Before the mid-1990s, Chinese ground forces relied on the Type 63 amphibious light tank developed in the early 1960s. The low swimming-speed and weak firepower of the Type 63 was insufficient to the needs of modern maritime amphibious assault operations that PLA would conduct. The PLA demanded a replacement for the Type 63 in the early 1990s, which led to the development of the Type 63A in 1997. Reports indicate that over 300 examples has been delivered to the PLA by the end of 2000. The tank is also used by the Tanzanian armed forces.

Compared to the Type 63, the Type 63A featured five major improvements:
The modernised Type 63 to Type 63A has given enhanced sea travelling performance, increased swimming speed, improved fire-control system, ATGM capability, and larger 105 mm rifled gun with dual stabilizers.

Design

Characteristics
The Type 63A is a lightly armoured amphibious light tank with a flat, boat-like hull. Suspension is made up of 6 road wheels and lead or return rollers. A redesigned welded turret from the original Type 63 is mounted center of the hull, with the powerpack positioned in the rear. The Type 63A has 2 additional floating tanks to increase the stability of the vehicle in the water. There are 3 water inlets on both sides of the hull. In the rear of the hull there are to allow 2 large water jets for travelling in water.

Armament
Type 63A introduces an enlarged welded turret replacing the original Type 63 turret, the modernised Type 63A utilises a two-axis stabilised ZPL-98 105 mm rifled gun replacing the 85 mm gun. The 105 mm rifled gun fires armour piercing fin stabilised discarding sabot (APFSDS), high explosive (HE), and high-explosive anti-tank (HEAT) ammunitions, and GP105 laser beam riding guided missiles. A total of 45 rounds can be carried inside the vehicle. APFSDS round can penetrates 400 mm RHA armour or destroy a reinforced concrete bunker at a distance of 2,000 m.

To overcome the inaccuracy of firing when swimming, the GP105 gun-launched missile uses laser-beam guidance which is not affected by wave motion while swimming. The missile has a maximum firing range of 4–5 km with a first hit probability of +90% against stationary targets. It can also engage low-flying helicopters. Secondary weapons include QJC-88 roof-mounted machine gun and Type 63 coaxial machine gun.

Mobility
The Type 63A enhance capability allowing the vehicle to conduct amphibious operations from its host amphibious warfare ships at distances from 5–7 km to the shore at a speed of 28 km/h.

Fire control
The FCS includes digital fire-control computer, integrated commander sight with laser rangefinder input, and white-light spotter or image-stabilised gunner's sight w/ passive night vision. The Type 63A night vision is an image intensifier system. Alternatively the gunner sight can be fitted with a thermal imager night vision. It is also equipped with the satellite positioning (GPS/GLONASS) system to allow accurate landing position in harsh weather conditions and night operations. It's also equipped with computerised fire-control to enable accurate firing both on land and at sea.

Operators

 People's Liberation Army Ground Force – 100 as of 2021. Phasing out.

References

Amphibious tanks
Post–Cold War light tanks
Light tanks of the People's Republic of China
Military vehicles introduced in the 1990s